Ferrocentral was an Argentine private railway company, with a name formed by a combination of the Spanish words for "Central Rail". It operated long-distance passenger trains from its base at Retiro station in Buenos Aires to several locations in northern Argentina, running on Ferrocarril Mitre's  Indian gauge tracks.

The company also ran regional services (such as Tren de las Sierras) on Ferrocarril Belgrano's  tracks in Córdoba Province. The National Government invested $10 million to re-open the line.

History

All of the train routes managed by Ferrocentral had been previously operated by Ferrocarriles Argentinos, the country's now-defunct national passenger railroad corporation. After the privatisation of Ferrocarriles Argentinos starting in 1991, many train services across Argentina were indefinitely discontinued. Since the year 2005, however, Ferrocentral was formed and successfully resurrected some passenger lines.

Ferrocentral was established in 2005, being formed by two railway companies, Nuevo Central Argentino (concessionary of Ferrocarril Mitre's freight services) and Ferrovías (which operates the Belgrano Norte Line) with the purpose of running trains from Retiro station in Buenos Aires to the city of Córdoba.

In 2006 Ferrocentral started to run trains to Tucumán, with stops in Rosario and La Banda, a city of Santiago del Estero Province. Long-distance passenger trains were tractioned by GT22 diesel locomotives. Most services operated in the late night and early morning hours as the rail lines are used for transporting cargo during the daytime.

One year later the company also re-opened the Tren de las Sierras ("Mountain Range Train") of Córdoba Province that connected the cities of Córdoba and Cosquín.

On 2013, Ministry of Transport of Argentina, Florencio Randazzo, signed a resolution transferring the services to Córdoba and San Miguel de Tucumán to State-owned companies SOFSE (also known as "Trenes Argentinos") and Administración de Infraestructuras Ferroviarias (ADIF).

In addition, some problems with ticket sales were reported by users, accusing the company to give a poor service for online purchasing, as well as the virtually nil availability of seats.

In November 2014, the Government of Argentina (through the State-owned company Trenes Argentinos S.A.) took over the services to Rosario, Tucumán and Córdoba, leaving Ferrocentral inactive.

Services
Services operated as of October 2014:

See also 
 Ferrovías
 Nuevo Central Argentino
 Ferrocarril Mitre

References

External links

 Official website (archived, 17 Dec 2008)

Defunct railway companies of Argentina
Emepa Group
Railway companies established in 2004
Railway companies disestablished in 2014
2004 establishments in Argentina
2014 disestablishments in Argentina
Rail transport in Buenos Aires Province
Rail transport in Córdoba Province, Argentina
Rail transport in Santa Fe Province
Transport in Tucumán Province
Transport in Santiago del Estero Province